Judo has been a part of the Pan American Games since 1963 edition in São Paulo, Brazil, but only for men. Women's competition started on 1983, in Caracas, Venezuela.

Medal table
Updated to include the 2019 edition.

Medalists

External links 
Panamerican Judo Confederation

American Games
 
Sports at the Pan American Games
American Games